Joseph Albert Scibelli (April 19, 1939 – December 11, 1991) was an American football tackle and guard who played fifteen seasons in the National Football League (NFL) with the Los Angeles Rams.

He joined the Rams at the age of 21 in 1961 and did not leave until he was 36 years of age in 1976.
He helped the Rams win the 1967 and 1969 NFC Coastal Division and the 1973-75 NFC West.

During his tenure with the Rams they led the NFL in scoring in 1967 and 1973, total yards gained in 1973 and the NFC in yards rushing in 1973.

In 1965, he and several of his Ram teammates had cameo roles as football players in the Perry Mason episode, "The Case of the 12th Wildcat."

Scibelli played in the Pro Bowl in 1968 and an All-Pro selection in 1973.

He died in 1991 of cancer at the New England Baptist Hospital.

References

1939 births
1991 deaths
American football offensive linemen
American people of Italian descent
Los Angeles Rams players
Western Conference Pro Bowl players
Notre Dame Fighting Irish football players
Players of American football from Massachusetts